= La Croix de la Grise =

Coordinates: 50°37′59″N 3°30′53″E

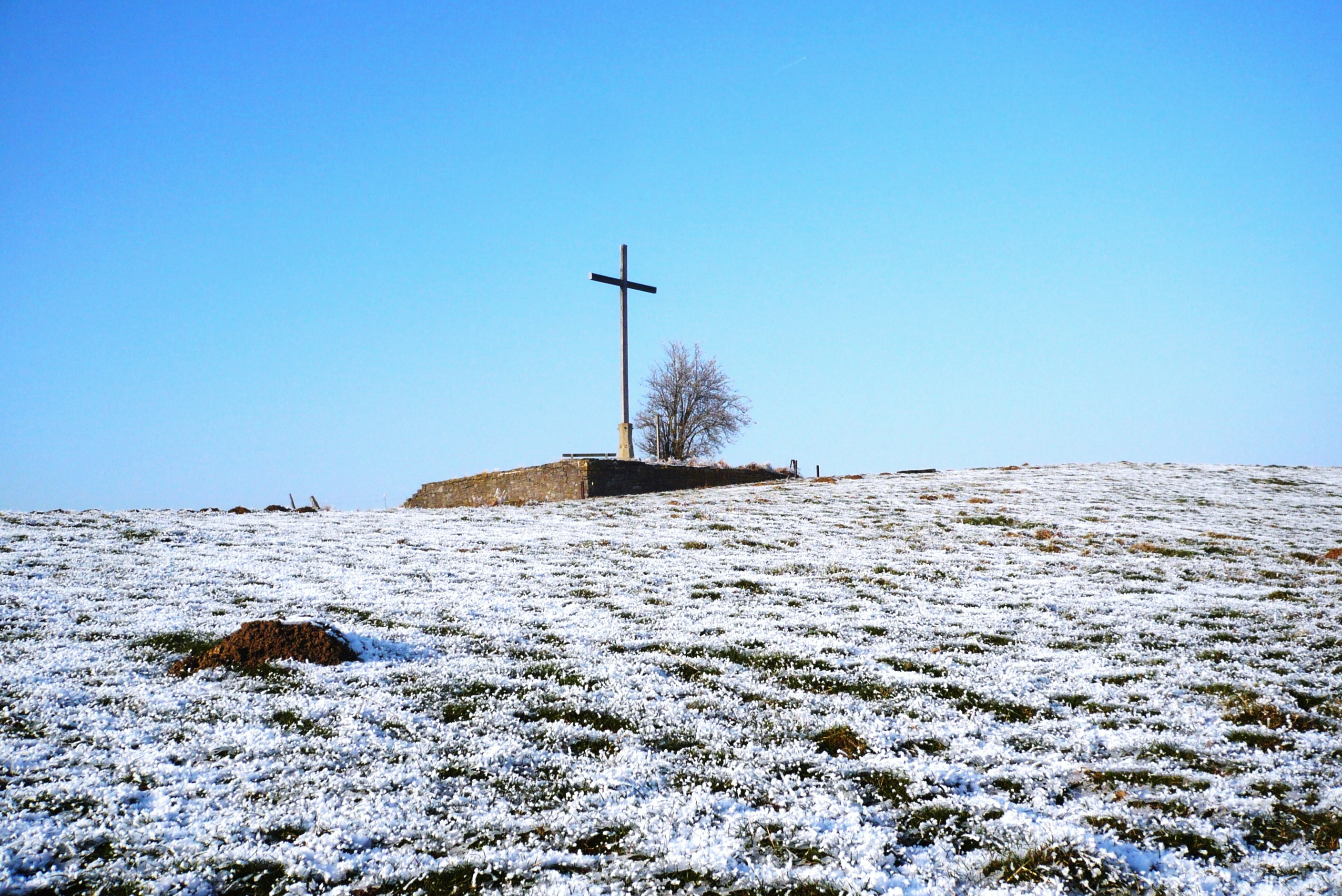
La Croix de la Grise in winter.

La Croix de la Grise is a monument atop an 81-metre (266 ft) hill in Havinnes, in the hills near Tournai, Belgium. It was put up in 1961 by Gabriel Dusquene de la Vinelle, who collected and distributed money to the armed resistance, the work refusers and war victims at Tournai during World War II.
